Silvia "Sissi" Carignano (born 11 August 1987) is an Italian former ice hockey player. She competed in the women's tournament at the 2006 Winter Olympics.

References

External links
 
 
 
 

1987 births
Living people
Italian women's ice hockey players
Olympic ice hockey players of Italy
Ice hockey players at the 2006 Winter Olympics
People from Pinerolo
Sportspeople from the Metropolitan City of Turin
European Women's Hockey League players